Eva Flyborg (born 1963) is a Swedish Liberal People's Party politician, and has been a member of the Parliament of Sweden since 1994. She has been the chairperson of the Swedish National Audit Office (Riksrevisionen) since 2006.

Biography 
Flyborg was born and raised in Otterhällan in Gothenburg, as the youngest of four siblings in a liberal family. She was never a member of the Liberal People's Party youth wing, Liberal Youth of Sweden, but took up politics when Bengt Westerberg "came and spoke well of social responsibility and entrepreneurs and enterprises". Before she was elected to the Riksdag she worked for Volvo.

Flyborg has a son, Karl.

References

External links 
 Web page on the Liberal People's Party website
 Blog
 Twitter account
 Eva Flyborg on the Swedish Parliament website

1963 births
21st-century Swedish women politicians
Articles containing video clips
Living people
Members of the Riksdag 1994–1998
Members of the Riksdag 1998–2002
Members of the Riksdag 2002–2006
Members of the Riksdag 2006–2010
Members of the Riksdag 2010–2014
Members of the Riksdag from the Liberals (Sweden)
Women members of the Riksdag